Arno Kamminga (born 22 October 1995) is a Dutch swimmer. He won silver medals in the 100 metre breaststroke and 200 metre breaststroke events at the 2020 Summer Olympics.

He competed in the men's 50 metre breaststroke event at the 2017 World Aquatics Championships.

Personal bests

References

External links
 

1995 births
Living people
Sportspeople from Katwijk
Dutch male breaststroke swimmers
European Aquatics Championships medalists in swimming
Olympic swimmers of the Netherlands
Swimmers at the 2020 Summer Olympics
Olympic silver medalists for the Netherlands
Olympic silver medalists in swimming
Medalists at the 2020 Summer Olympics
Medalists at the FINA World Swimming Championships (25 m)
World Aquatics Championships medalists in swimming